Freeway Killer is a 2010 crime horror thriller film directed by John Murlowski, and written by David Birke. A direct-to-video release, it is based on the crimes of William Bonin, an American serial killer who raped, tortured, and murdered at least twenty-one men and boys in Southern California in 1979 and 1980. It stars Scott Anthony Leet as Bonin, and co-stars Cole Williams, Dusty Sorg, Debbon Ayer, Eileen Dietz, and Michael Rooker.

Plot 

William Bonin is a Vietnam veteran who works as a delivery driver in Southern California. Bonin, when not preoccupied with his job or his ailing mother, tortures and kills young men with the aid of an occultist named Vernon Butts. The two committed a string of murders in Orange County before relocating to Los Angeles.

By 1980, Bonin and Vern's relationship has become strained, so Bonin begins grooming a new accomplice, an insecure youth named Kyle Peterson. Bonin shows Kyle pictures of his and Vern's victims before coercing him into helping him murder a boy who was hitchhiking to Disneyland. Kyle is enthralled by Bonin's survival of the fittest philosophy and stories about the Vietnam War, and, under his tutelage, becomes more confident and assertive, being promoted to manager at his job, and rekindling his relationship with his girlfriend, Lisa. Vern becomes envious of Bonin's relationship with Kyle, and, during an argument, claims that Bonin never saw combat in Vietnam, and instead spent all of his time overseas "sticking his pistol to a couple of buck privates, making them suck his dick." Kyle convinces Bonin to kill Vern, but Bonin is unable to go through with it, and instead tends to Vern's wound after Vern slits his own wrist in front of him and Kyle.

Bonin, feeling alienated from both Kyle and Vern, forces another a youth named Billy Pugh to help him kill a boy named Alex. Billy is sickened by the murder and runs away, panicking Bonin. Kyle and Vern will not answer any of Bonin's calls, and when Bonin confronts Kyle in-person and tries to convince him to commit a "Freeway Killer" copycat crime to mislead investigators, Kyle refuses, telling Bonin, "It's over." Even though the authorities are closing in on him, Bonin tries to commit another murder, and is caught in the act by a police taskforce led by Detective St. John. Vern hangs himself in prison after he, Kyle, and Billy are turned in by Bonin, who is sentenced to death after he refuses to allow his legal counsel to admit potentially mitigating evidence, like psychiatric reports and files pertaining to his turbulent family history and upbringing, due to not wanting to subject his mother to the burden of taking the stand and having the media label her a "freakshow."

While on death row, Bonin confesses to further murders in exchange for privileges like fast food, and eventually makes the acquaintance of Ruth Slobod, a grieving mother who believes that her son was murdered by Bonin. Bonin is not sure if he killed Ruth's son, but he spends years stringing her along anyway, to alleviate his boredom and loneliness, and to manipulate her into helping him try and get a commutation of his sentence from the Governor of California. When Ruth becomes sick of Bonin's games and vows to be present for his execution so that she can watch him die, Bonin mockingly advises her to "watch the eyes" because "that's where it all happens."

The film ends with Bonin being executed via lethal injection in 1996, and with an intertitle stating that his unclaimed remains were cremated and scattered over the Pacific Ocean.

Cast

Release 

Freeway Killer was released on DVD and Blu-ray by Image Entertainment on February 16, 2010. The film's special features include an audio commentary with director John Murlowski and writer David Birke, and a making-of featurette titled Freeway Killer: Captured.

Reception 

Michael Allen of 28 Days Later Analysis gave Freeway Killer a score of 7/10, and while critical of how little it delved into Bonin's background and certain aspects of his crimes, otherwise praised it, writing, "Balancing itself nicely on the catwalk between being an entertainment piece and being simply informative the film leaves the darkest parts of Bonin's unresolved sexual conflicts out of the show in order to respect the viewers' sensitivities. An enjoyable watch from beginning to end, viewers need to pay attention to future performances from Scott Leet." David Van Der Haeghen of DVD Town also praised Scott Anthony Leet's performance, calling it "strong, lifelike and memorable" and further opining, "His demeanor and timing throughout the short 88-minute run time are on point, and if this weren't a smaller release, he might have hit more radar screens for awards consideration."

While Ruud Stift of Cinemagazine enjoyed the film, he also felt that it was "a bit too superficial" and "clearly no Se7en" before giving it a final score of 2.5/5. In a review written for Rue Morgue, John W. Bowen commended Leet's acting, which they felt elevated what was otherwise a "fair-to-middlin' effort" that was marred by aspects like obvious budgetary constraints and a "curious squeamishness over addressing Bonin's homosexuality." Casey Broadwater of Blu-ray.com condemned Freeway Killer, giving it a score of 1.5/5 and bluntly stating, "The film tries desperately to get inside the mind of a murderer, but it's constantly thwarted by budgetary constraints, a stilted script, and awkward, hammy performances."

References

External links 

 
 

2010 crime thriller films
2010 direct-to-video films
2010 films
2010 horror films
2010 independent films
2010 LGBT-related films
2010 psychological thriller films
2010s American films
2010s biographical films
2010s English-language films
2010s exploitation films
2010s horror thriller films
2010s police films
2010s psychological horror films
2010s serial killer films
American biographical films
American crime thriller films
American direct-to-video films
American exploitation films
American films based on actual events
American horror thriller films
American independent films
American LGBT-related films
American nonlinear narrative films
American police detective films
American psychological horror films
American psychological thriller films
American serial killer films
Biographical films about LGBT people
Biographical films about military personnel
Biographical films about serial killers
Crime films based on actual events
Crime horror films
Cultural depictions of American men
Cultural depictions of kidnappers
Cultural depictions of male serial killers
Cultural depictions of rapists
Direct-to-video crime films
Direct-to-video horror films
Direct-to-video thriller films
Films about American military personnel
Films about capital punishment
Films about grieving
Films about hitchhiking
Films about kidnapping in the United States
Films about mother–son relationships
Films about self-harm
Films about sex crimes
Films about the Los Angeles Police Department
Films about veterans
Films directed by John Murlowski
Films set in 1979
Films set in 1980
Films set in 1981
Films set in 1996
Films set in Los Angeles
Films set in Los Angeles County, California
Films set in Orange County, California
Films set in San Quentin State Prison
Films shot in Los Angeles
Films shot in Los Angeles County, California
Films with screenplays by David Birke
Horror films based on actual events
LGBT-related horror thriller films
LGBT-related films based on actual events
Male bisexuality in film
Murder–suicide in films
Period horror films
RLJE Films
Thriller films based on actual events
Torture in films